Hacha may refer to:
 Emil Hácha (1872–1945), the third President of Czechoslovakia from 1938 to 1939
 Hacha (corporation), a Chinese electronics manufacturer mostly involved with portable media player (PMP) design and manufacture
 the Spanish name for Kyphosus elegans, a marine fish
 Portable stone court markers usually depicting animals or skulls placed around the arena of a Maya Ballgame
 Hacha'a, a poetry, music, and dance form originally from northern Iraq

See also
 Hache (disambiguation)